Krzysztof Hausner (13 March 1944, in Kraków – 26 January 2004, in Kraków) was a Polish football right-wing forward, most notable for his performances for Cracovia Krakow. Hausner also capped once for the Polish National Team, in the 16 April 1967 game versus Luxembourg (0-0).

As a member of the junior team of Poland, Hausner won silver in the U-19 championships of Europe (Portugal, 1961). In 1962, after a brief period in Unia Tarnow, he was purchased by Cracovia Krakow and remained there until 1967. Then, he shortly played for Zaglebie Sosnowiec, Wisła Kraków and Kalwarianka Kalwaria Zebrzydowska. After finishing career, Hausner left Poland for Chicago, where he occasionally played for local Polonia teams and worked as a coach.

References

1944 births
2004 deaths
Footballers from Kraków
Polish-American culture in Chicago
Polish footballers
Poland international footballers
MKS Cracovia (football) players
Association football forwards
Unia Tarnów players